Ruprecht Machleidt (born December 18, 1943, in Kiel, Germany ) is a German-American theoretical nuclear physicist.

Education and CV
Machleidt studied physics at the University of Bonn, Germany, where he received his master's degree (Diplom-Physiker) in 1971 and his doctorate in 1973. As a postdoc, he continued at the Institute for Theoretical Nuclear Physics at the University of Bonn until 1975. The years 1976 and 1977 he spent at the State University of New York at Stony Brook (SUNY) with the group of Gerry Brown. From 1978 to 1983 he was a research associate (Wissenschaftlicher Assistant) in Bonn. 1983 to 1985 he was a visiting scientist at TRIUMF, University of British Columbia, in Vancouver, Canada, and from 1986 to 1988 at the Los Alamos National Laboratory (at LAMPF), Los Alamos, New Mexico, USA. At the same time, he was an Adjunct Associate Professor at UCLA, Los Angeles. In 1988, he accepted the position of associate professor and in 1991 full professor at the University of Idaho, Moscow, Idaho, USA.

Work
He is known as one of the developers of the Bonn potential  to describe the nucleon–nucleon interaction based upon a comprehensive meson exchange model. Next he dealt with nuclear matter, taking into account meson degrees of freedom and relativistic effects (Dirac–Brueckner–Hartree–Fock).
Since about 2000, Machleidt's main focus has been the development of nuclear forces based upon chiral effective field theory.

Selected works 
 "Nuclear Forces", Scholarpedia, Volume 9(1), 2014, p. 30710 (http://www.scholarpedia.org/article/Nuclear_Forces)
 "Chiral effective field theory and nuclear forces", Physics Reports, Volume 503, 2011, pp. 1–75, with D.R. Entem
 "Accurate charge-dependent nucleon-nucleon potential at fourth order of chiral perturbation theory", Phys. Rev. C, Volume 68, 2003, p. 041001, with D. R. Entem
 "Shell model description of the C-14 dating beta decay with Brown-Rho-scaled NN interactions", Phys. Rev. Lett., Volume 100, 2008, pp. 062501, with J.W. Holt, Gerald Brown, Thomas Kuo, J.D. Holt
 "The nucleon - nucleon interaction", Topical Review, J. Phys. G: Nucl. Part Phys., Volume 27, 2001, pp. R69 - R108, with I. Slaus
 "High-precision, charge-dependent, Bonn nucleon-nucleon Potential", Phys. Rev. C, Volume 63, 2001, p. 024001
 "Relativistic nuclear structure I: Nuclear matter", Phys. Rev. C, Volume 42, 1990, p. 1965, with R. Brockmann
 "Nuclear saturation in a relativistic Brueckner-Hartree–Fock approach", Phys. Lett., Volume 149B, 1984, p. 283, with R. Brockmann
 "The meson theory of nuclear forces and nuclear structure, Advances in Nucl . Phys., Volume 19, 1989, pp. 189-376
 "The Bonn meson-exchange model for the nucleon - nucleon interaction", Physics Reports, Volume 149, 1987, pp. 1–89, with K. Holinde and Ch. Elster
 "Momentum-space OBEP, two-nucleon and nuclear matter data", Nucl. Phys., Volume A247, 1975, p. 495, with K. Holinde
 "Neutron matter with a relativistic one-boson-exchange potential", Nucl. Phys., Volume A205, 1973, p. 292, with K. Bleuler, K. Erkelenz, and K. Holinde

External links 
Home page in Idaho (http://machleidt.weebly.com)

References

German nuclear physicists
American nuclear physicists
1943 births
Living people
Fellows of the American Physical Society